Beaver Creek is a community in Yukon, Canada. The community's main employers are a Canada Border Services Agency port, the White River First Nation and a number of tourist lodges.

It is the home of the White River First Nation. The First Nation is made up of Upper Tanana speaking people whose traditional territory extends from the Donjek River into neighbouring Alaska, and Athapaskan Northern Tutchone speaking people whose traditional territories included the lower Stewart River and the area south of the Yukon River on the White and Donjek River drainages.
In addition to the Alaska Highway, the community is served by the Beaver Creek Airport.

Prior to 1983, the customs station was located in the middle of the community, with the resulting confusion: individuals driving past without stopping, and locals with a new vehicle not being recognized as they drove by.

Climate

Like most of Yukon, Beaver Creek has a subarctic climate (Dfc), and NRC Plant Hardiness Zone of 0a.

Demographics 

References

External links 

 Community Profile
 White River First Nation

Northern Tutchone
Settlements in Yukon